Abdol Khan Rural District is a rural district (dehestan) in Shavur District, Shush County, Khuzestan Province, Iran. At the 2006 census, its population was 24,093, in 3,811 families.  The rural district has 57 villages.

References 

Rural Districts of Khuzestan Province
Shush County